St Declan's School is a primary school in the Ballsbridge area of Dublin, close to the Aviva Stadium. It differs from other schools in the area because it was created by the Society of Jesus (with the Archbishop of Dublin), to offer specialised education for pupils with mild emotional and behavioural difficulties.

History

Foundation
In 1958, the Society of Jesus, in the person of the late Father Dermot Casey S.J., founded St Declan's as a school to teach boys and girls, of all denominations, who needed to reach their potential outside of the mainstream primary educational system.

Constitution
In 1959, the St Declan's Association, a group which supported the school, created the first constitution for the school, its aims for that the school would help children 'overcome their particular difficulties as quickly as possible so as to enable a speedy return to mainstream schools,' and that children would be taught 'at various levels within the same classroom, according to their individual abilities and needs.'

21st century
In 2008, the school celebrated its fiftieth anniversary in the nearby St Mary's Church, the Mass was presided over by the Provincial of the Jesuits in Ireland.

As of 2012, the school has 48 pupils with a pupil to teacher ratio of 8 to 1.

See also
 List of Jesuit sites in Ireland
 List of Jesuit schools

References

External links
 

Primary schools in Dublin (city)
Educational institutions established in 1958
Catholic primary schools in the Republic of Ireland
1958 establishments in Ireland
Jesuit schools in Ireland